Allurupadu is a village in Krishna district of the Indian state of Andhra Pradesh. It is located in Vatsavai mandal of Vijayawada revenue division. Agricultural products of the village include rice, chili peppers and cotton.

See also 
List of villages in Krishna district

References 

Villages in Krishna district